The Mad River is a  river in eastern New Hampshire in the United States. It is a tributary of the Cochecho River, part of the Piscataqua River watershed leading to the Atlantic Ocean.

The river is located entirely in the town of Farmington. It rises in Nubble Pond, between Nubble Mountain and Hussey Mountain, and flows northwest, then northeast, reaching the Cochecho near the town center of Farmington.

See also

List of rivers of New Hampshire

References

Rivers of New Hampshire
Rivers of Strafford County, New Hampshire